Chatti pathiri is a layered pastry made in the Malabar region, of Kerala, India. It is made in both sweet and savoury variations. The dish is similar to the Italian lasagna, but instead of pasta, pastry sheets / pancakes made with flour, egg, oil and water are used. The filling depends on the variation desired. The sweet ones are made with sweetened beaten eggs, nuts and raisins, seasoned with cardamom. The savoury ones are made with traditional meat filling used in making samosas or savoury puffs. The flour is kneaded into soft dough and rolled into thin pancakes. These pancakes are soaked in milk to soften them and arranged in layers. The fillings are added between these layers. Once layered, it goes in for baking at 180 degrees for approximately 20 minutes.

An essential ingredient to enhance the authenticity of the dish is white poppy seeds, used extensively in Malabar cuisine while making biryani and meat stews. It is considered an essential part of any festival, pre- and post-wedding events, and Iftar. This dish is popular during the Ramadan Fasting period.

Similar dishes
Similar dishes available in Malabar cuisine include:

See also

 Pathiri
 Kinnathappam
 Kalathappam
 Unnakai
 List of pastries
 List of stuffed dishes

References

External links

Flatbread dishes
Kerala cuisine
Pastries with poppy seeds
Stuffed dishes